Lucas Bögl (born 14 June 1990) is a German cross-country skier who competes internationally.

He competed for Germany at the FIS Nordic World Ski Championships 2017 in Lahti, Finland.

Cross-country skiing results
All results are sourced from the International Ski Federation (FIS).

Olympic Games

Distance reduced to 30 km due to weather conditions.

World Championships

World Cup

Season standings

References

External links

1990 births
Living people
Skiers from Munich
German male cross-country skiers
Cross-country skiers at the 2018 Winter Olympics
Cross-country skiers at the 2022 Winter Olympics
Olympic cross-country skiers of Germany
Tour de Ski skiers